Lauenburg is a city in Schleswig-Holstein, Germany

It may also refer to:

 Lauenburg (district), district in Schleswig-Holstein 
 Saxe-Lauenburg, former principality in the Holy Roman Empire and later Germany
 Naturpark Lauenburgische Seen, nature park in Lauenburg District
 Burg Lauenburg, a castle in the eastern Harz Mountains
 Lauenburg in Pommern, the German name of Lębork, Pomeranian Voivodeship, Poland
 Landkreis Lauenburg in Pommern, former Prussian administrative unit
 , a German weather ship whose capture by the Allies in World War II provided information about the Enigma code